The Qemant (also known as western Agaws) are a small ethnic group in northwestern Ethiopia specifically in Gondar, Amhara Region. The Qemant people traditionally practiced an early Pagan-Hebraic religion, however most members of the Qemant are followers of the Ethiopian Orthodox Church. Despite their historic relationship, they should not be confused with the Beta Israel.

The ethnicity's population is reported to be  172,000, according to the 1994 national census; the latest available national census, the one performed in 2007, does not list them as a separate group. However, only 1,625 people still speak Qimant, and it is considered endangered, as most children speak Amharic; likewise, adherence to the traditional religion has dropped substantially, as most of the population has converted to Christianity. Converts often consider themselves to be Amharas.

The Qemant live in an area traditionally called Qwara, along an axis stretching from Ayikel in Chilga woreda to Kirakir and north to Lake Tana in the woredas of Lay Armachiho. They are mainly farmers.

The Qemant are divided into two patrilineal moieties, the Keber and the Yetanti; the Keber is higher in rank. A traditional Qemant can only marry a member of the other moiety, so, while the moieties are exogamous, Qemant society as a whole is endogamous.

Religion
The Qemant traditionally practiced a religion which is often described as "Hebraic" . According to the American anthropologist Frederic C. Gamst, their "Hebraism is an ancient form and unaffected by Hebraic change of the past two millennia". A recent sociolinguistic survey notes that the Qemant religion is in a very precarious situation since very few people still adhere to it due to rapid assimilation. According to this study, the ratio of those who follow the Qemant religion vs. those who are baptized and converted to Ethiopian Orthodox Christianity is about 1% vs. 99%.

Their religious observances include a literal reading of the 11th chapter of Leviticus (see Kashrut). As with mainstream Judaism, even permitted animals can only be consumed if they are properly slaughtered (see Shechita). Their practices include continued animal sacrifices, and the tending of sacred groves (called degegna).
Worship is conducted outdoors, usually at a site near a sacred tree (called qole), wrapped in variously-colored strips of cloth. This appears to be a survival of a biblical tradition:
Abraham planted a grove in Beersheba, and called there the name of God (Genesis 21:33).
and
..where the women wove hangings for the grove (II Kings 23:7).
However, due to their dislike to being observed by the increasingly pervasive Christians, they eventually constructed a prayer-hall at Chelga.
The Sabbath is observed on Saturday, when it is forbidden to light a fire. The extent as to which they observe other prohibitions often found in Judaism is unclear.

The Qemant call their Deity Adara (God) or Yeadara (My God) or Mezgana, which might be a proper name. He is described as omnipresent, omnipotent, omniscient, and anthropomorphic. He is approachable directly or through qedus which are angels or culture heroes.

The highest political and religious leader among the Qemant is their High Priest, called the Wember (also transliterated Womber and Wambar), an Amharic term meaning "seat." There were formerly two superior wambars, at Karkar and at Chelga, with the first being senior, and a varying number of subordinate wambars in other parts of Qemantland. All wambars are chosen from certain lineages in the Keber moiety. The last wambar of Karkar died in 1955, and since then the only wambar has been Mulunah Marsha, Wambar of Chelga (born 1935). Each wambar chose (from the Keber moiety) one or more delegates with the title of afaliq to represent him in judicial matters. These men traveled the countryside, settling disputes, seeing that the laws were obeyed, and punishing wrongdoing, usually with a fine. Each wambar also chose two stewards with different titles, one from each moiety, who served different elements of the sacred meals.

There are two orders of priesthood, the kamazana, the higher, of the Keber moiety, and the abayegariya, the lower, of the Yetanti moiety. Each Qemant locality has at least one of each; they must work together to conduct the traditional sacrifices and other religious ceremonies. When offering a sacrifice, the abayegaria holds the legs of the victim and the kamazana wields the knife. The priests also have a subordinate judicial function.

History
Due to lack of written evidences, for some scholars, the origin of the Qemant is obscure.

However, according to the Qemant tradition and history, everything started when Noah's ark settled at the top of Mount Ararat also believed to be Mount Guna which is located in northern Amhara region. the meaning of guna in Qemant language is "starting point". Qemants are descended from Yaner (also called Ayaner). He is “…the grandson of Canaan, the fourth son of Ham, son of
Noah. Noha and his familily starts to live there for few years but Shem and Japheth moved to Asia and middle east however Noha and his son Ham stayed  in Ethiopia until his death . Noah was buried in now day The Fasil Ghebbi and his wife aykel was buried in chelga aykel city, here we can see  city aykel is named after Noah's wife.   However according to some legends, Canaan’s son, Arwadi, came to Ethiopia from the land of Canaan to found the Qemant group, whereas in other legends it is Arwadi’s son, Yaner did so.”.

According to the early 19th century missionary Samuel Gobat, their neighbours considered the Qemant boudas, or sorcerers, along with "the Falashas or Jews (Beta Israel), most Mussulmans (Muslims), and some Christians." Gobat knew little more about this "small Pagan people inhabiting the mountains in the vicinity of Gondar."

Writing in 1967, US anthropologist F. Gamst said he expected total assimilation of the Qemant with the Amhara within three decades. However in the modern era, Qemant identity has resurfaced.

Today, most ethnic Qemants overwhelmingly identify as Amharas, and Qemant was removed as an identity from Ethiopia’s 2007 national census, but there are some Qemant communities who are still attempting to preserve their culture and language.

See also
Beta Israel
Jews and Judaism in Africa

References

Further reading
 Gamst, Frederic C. (1969) The Qemant. A Pagan-Hebraic Peasantry of Ethiopia. New York: Holt, Rinehart And Winston.
 Leyew, Zelealem (2002) 'Sociolinguistic Survey Report of the Kemant (Qimant) Language of Ethiopia' (SILESR2002-031). online version (PDF)
 Leyew, Zelealem (2003) The Kemantney Language. Köln: Rüdiger Köppe Verlag.
 Quirin, James (1998), Caste And Class In Historical North-West Ethiopia: The Beta Israel (Falasha) And The Kemant, 1300-1900

Ethnic groups in Ethiopia
Semitic-speaking peoples